Solomon Asante (born 6 March 1990) is a Ghanaian professional footballer as a winger for USL Championship club Indy Eleven. With Phoenix Rising FC, he was named the 2019 and 2020 USL Championship Most Valuable Player (MVP).

Early life
Born in Ghana to Ghanaian parents, Solomon Asante started his career at the Ghanaian club Feyenoord Ghana, where he played until 2009.

Club career

ASFA Yennenga
Solomon Asante joined Burkinabé club ASFA Yennenga from Feyenoord Ghana, at the beginning of the 2009–2010 season. In his second season with ASFA Yennenga he won the 2010–2011 Burkinabé Premier League, 2010–2011 top-goalscorer and was also the 2009–2010 Burkinabé Premier League top-goalscorer with 14 goals. He spent two season's with ASFA Yennenga.

Berekum Chelsea
Solomon Asante signed for Ghanaian Ghana Premier League club Berekum Chelsea at the beginning of the 2011–12 Ghana Premier League season.

TP Mazembe
He played for TP Mazembe and won numerous continental and local laurels.

Phoenix Rising FC
Asante signed with Phoenix Rising FC of the United Soccer League on 21 December 2017. Asante left on February 1, 2022, after leading the club to two USL Championship Finals and the Regular Season Title in 2019. He was team captain for three of his four seasons.

Indy Eleven
On 11 April 2022, it was announced that Asante had signed with USL Championship side Indy Eleven.

International career
He made his debut for Burkina Faso against South Africa at Ellis Park on 8 August 2011 in an international friendly. He scored his first goal for Burkina Faso in the 87th minute scoring one goal. In November 2011, he dropped from the national team to join his home country Ghana. He scored a goal against England on 22 September 2011 at Luzhniki Stadium in Moscow the game final score 6–1 Solomon helped the team advance to face Germany but he suffered an injury.

Ghana national team
On 16 May 2012, he was called up to the Ghana squad for two 2014 World Cup qualification matches against Lesotho national team and Zambia national team but was later dropped, due to concerns over his eligibility to play for Ghana.
He has since been cleared to play for Ghana.

Career Statistics

Honours
ASFA Yennenga
 Burkinabé Premier League: 2010–11
Phoenix Rising

 USL Championship Regular Season: 2019
 Western Conference
 Winners (Regular Season): 2019, 2021
 Winners (Playoffs): 2018, 2020

Individual

 Burkinabé Premier League Top scorer: 2009–10, 2010–11
 Ghana Player of the Year: 2017
 USL Championship Most Valuable Player: 2019 & 2020
 USL Championship All-League First Team: 2018, 2019, 2020
USL Championship Top scorer: 2019
USL Championship Assists Champion: 2019, 2020
Phoenix Rising Most Valuable Player (Fan's Choice): 2019
 Phoenix Rising Goal of the season: 2019
 Phoenix Rising Players Player of the year: 2019
Records
 Phoenix Rising's all-time top scorer with 36 goals – 2019.
USL Championship most assists in a season (17) – 2019
 Phoenix Rising's single-season goal record.
 USL most combined goals and assists in a season.

References

External links 
 

1990 births
Living people
Association football wingers
ASFA Yennenga players
Berekum Chelsea F.C. players
Ghana Premier League players
TP Mazembe players
Phoenix Rising FC players
Indy Eleven players
Burkinabé footballers
Burkina Faso international footballers
Ghanaian footballers
Ghana international footballers
Dual internationalists (football)
Footballers from Kumasi
2013 Africa Cup of Nations players
2015 Africa Cup of Nations players
West African Football Academy players
USL Championship players
Ghanaian expatriate sportspeople in Burkina Faso
Ghanaian expatriate sportspeople in the Democratic Republic of the Congo
Ghanaian expatriate sportspeople in the United States
Ghanaian expatriate footballers
Expatriate footballers in the Democratic Republic of the Congo
Ghanaian emigrants
Immigrants to Burkina Faso
Naturalized citizens of Burkina Faso
Expatriate soccer players in the United States
21st-century Burkinabé people